Gordon Currie may refer to:

 Gordon Gray Currie, Canadian provincial politician
 Gordon Currie (bobsleigh), Canadian bobsledder
 Gordon Currie (actor), Canadian-American film and television actor